Golani may refer to:

Golani Brigade, an Israeli infantry brigade
Golani Family, an Indian royal family
Golani Interchange, a location in Israel
Rivka Golani (b. 1946), an Israeli viola player
 Golani, anti-communist protestors, from the Romanian Golaniad
 a US-built version of the IMI Galil rifle.